Miguel Margalef (born 8 March 1956) is a Uruguayan former cyclist. He competed in the 1000m time trial and team pursuit events at the 1976 Summer Olympics.

References

External links
 

1956 births
Living people
Uruguayan male cyclists
Olympic cyclists of Uruguay
Cyclists at the 1976 Summer Olympics
Place of birth missing (living people)